Lorenzo Baroni (born 23 February 1990) is an Italian motorcycle racer.

Career statistics

Grand Prix motorcycle racing

By season

Races by year
(key)

External links
 Profile on MotoGP.com
 Profile on WorldSBK.com

1990 births
Living people
People from Lugo, Emilia-Romagna
Italian motorcycle racers
125cc World Championship riders
FIM Superstock 1000 Cup riders
Sportspeople from the Province of Ravenna